John C. Calhoun was the 7th vice president of the United States.

John Calhoun may also refer to:

John Calhoun (diver) (1925–2010), American Olympic diver
John Calhoun (publisher) (1808–1859), American publisher and politician
John A. Calhoun (1918–2000), American diplomat
John B. Calhoun (1917–1995), ethologist noted for his 1947 Norway rat and 1970s mice population dynamic studies
John C. Calhoun (police officer), Pittsburgh Police Chief in the 1920s
John Coleman Calhoun (1871–1950), politician in Alberta, Canada
 John C. Calhoun II (1843–1918), American planter and businessman
John R. Calhoun, merchant and political figure on Prince Edward Island in the 1870s
John William Calhoun, mathematics professor, University of Texas comptroller and president in the 1930s
John Calhoun, creator of the 1994 Macintosh game Glider PRO

See also
John Calhoon (1797–1???), United States Representative from Kentucky
John Calhoun Bell (1851–1933), United States Representative
John Calhoun Johnson (died 1876), lawyer and rancher
John Calhoun Phillips (1870–1943), governor of Arizona
John Calhoun Sheppard (1850–1931), governor of South Carolina
USS John C. Calhoun (SSBN-630)